The Roman Catholic Diocese of Chulucanas is a diocese located in the city of Chulucanas in the Ecclesiastical province of Piura in Peru.

History
4 March 1964: Established as Territorial Prelature of Chulucanas 
12 December 1988: Promoted as Diocese of Chulucanas

Bishops

Ordinaries
Prelate of Chulucanas (Roman rite) 
Bishop Juan Conway McNabb, O.S.A. (1964.03.04 – 1988.12.12); see below
Bishops of Chulucanas (Roman rite)
Bishop Juan Conway McNabb, O.S.A.  (1988.12.12 – 2000.10.28); see above
Bishop Daniel Thomas Turley Murphy, O.S.A. (2000.10.28 – 2020.04.02)
Bishop Cristóbal Bernardo Mejía Corral (2020.04.02 - present)

Coadjutor bishop
Daniel Thomas Turley Murphy, O.S.A. (1996-2000)

Other priest of this diocese who became bishop
Tarcisio Pusma Ibáñez, appointed Auxiliary Bishop of Trujillo in 2008; did not take effect

See also
Roman Catholicism in Peru

Sources
GCatholic.org
Catholic Hierarchy

Roman Catholic dioceses in Peru
Roman Catholic Ecclesiastical Province of Piura
Christian organizations established in 1964
Roman Catholic dioceses and prelatures established in the 20th century